Flavio Pimenta Alves  (born 30 November 1969) is a Brazilian writer, screenwriter, and film director resident in America since 1998. His movies consistently feature elderly characters as protagonists. He is best known for the film The Garden Left Behind starring Michael Madsen, Ed Asner and Carlie Guevara.

Early years
Alves was born in Rio de Janeiro, Brazil and served the Brazilian navy for several years before coming to America in 1997. He was granted political asylum in the United States in 1998 based on political opinion and sexual orientation after he wrote the book, Toque de Silêncio ("Call to Silence", 1997), describing his life as a gay man in the Brazilian navy. His request was granted because, according to Alves, he received death threats upon publishing his book. Although various human rights organizations, LGBT activists, and former São Paulo mayor Marta Suplicy supported his claim, it has also divided the Brazilian gay community. He attended Columbia University in New York City, where he earned an undergraduate degree in political science in 2007. In the early 2000s he worked as an assistant for then-Congressman Anthony Weiner (D-NY) and then-New York Senator Hillary Clinton (D-NY).

Career
In 2007, Alves left politics and enrolled at New York University to study film production. While there he wrote and directed, Even in My Dreams, which received the Technisphere Award from NYU for best student film, and was screened at a variety of film festivals around the world. The film was also the winner of the Golden Palm Award at the 2009 Mexico International Film Festival, and the Golden Ace Award at the 2009 Las Vegas International Film Festival. In June 2010, Flavio released his short film The Secret Friend, starring Viola Harris and Siobhan Fallon in the major roles.
The film received multiple awards and nominations after its premiere at the Palm Springs International Film Festival in 2010, where it was chosen as Best of the Fest. Alves also directed the award-winning short film, Tom in America (2014), starring  Academy Award nominees, Burt Young and Sally Kirkland, has been screened at over 140 film festivals worldwide, and was also featured on the cable network Here TV. 

Flavio's most recent film, The Garden Left Behind, is his first feature-length project and stars Michael Madsen and Ed Asner. The film was well received in the media, and was widely praised for having a strong trans representation in front of and behind the camera, including the lead, Carlie Guevara. The Garden Left Behind premiered at SXSW Film Festival in 2019, where it won the Audience Award. Caryn James/The Hollywood Reporter wrote, "It’s one thing to decide to make a movie about the struggles of the transgender community and violent attacks on it. But it’s far harder to turn that message into a film as natural and graceful as The Garden Left Behind. Directed by Flavio Alves, a producer making his first feature, this is a clear-eyed, poignant yet unsentimental drama about Tina, a trans woman and undocumented Mexican living in New York." Randy Myers/San Jose Mercury News raved: "The Garden Left Behind" will break your heart; a film of utter grace, poignancy and deep understanding." And Rotten Tomatoes listed The Garden Left Behind as No. 39 in their 200 Best LGBTQ Movies of All Time editorial and stated the Critics Consensus was: "The Garden Left Behind draws on one immigrant's journey to offer graceful, thought-provoking commentary on timely sociopolitical themes." 

In 2018, Alves was selected by the Film Society of Lincoln Center to the Artist Academy. The program is designed to support the next generation of filmmakers from a variety of backgrounds as they develop their careers and build audiences within the film community. 

In 2019, Flavio was selected to Ryan Murphy’s HALF Initiative Directing Program, aimed at creating equal opportunities for minorities behind the camera. 

And, in 2020, The National Association of Latino Independent Producers (NALIP) honored Alves with the Best Latinx Director Award for his debut feature The Garden Left Behind.

Ebay campaign
While in pre-production for his upcoming film, The Garden Left Behind, Alves and his team pioneered the use of eBay as a crowdfunding platform, where they raised more than $100,000. The unprecedented success experienced during this campaign revamped typical crowdfunding methods. The film became the first independent film to be funded substantially through donations and sales via eBay.

Personal life
Flavio lives in Forest Hills, New York. In April 2010, Alves became a US citizen. As of 2013, he has been a member of the National Board of Review. In 2012, Grupo Gay da Bahia, the oldest LGBTQ advocacy association in Brazil, awarded Alves, among 21 other militants, an honorary title recognizing his sacrifices and contributions to the LGBTQ community.

Filmography

Accolades

2021 Jerome Hill Artist Fellowship – Jerome Foundation 
2020 Best Latinx Director Award – NALIP (The Garden Left Behind)
2019 Directing Mentorship – HALF Initiative, Ryan Murphy 
2019 QueerScope Debut Film Award – Hamburg LGBT Film Festival (The Garden Left Behind)
2019 Audience Award – SXSW Film Festival (The Garden Left Behind)
2018 Artist Academy fellow – Film Society of Lincoln Center 
2017 Video and Digital Production Grants – Jerome Foundation (The Garden Left Behind)
2017 IFP Lab fellow – Independent Filmmaker Project: ifp (The Garden Left Behind) 
2016 NYSCA Grant – New York State Council on the Arts (The Garden Left Behind)
2015 The American Film Award (Tom in America)
2013 Student Grant – National Board of Review (Tom in America)
2011 Jury Award – Jornada Internacional de Cinema da Bahial (The Secret Friend)
2011 Audience Award – Indianapolis International Film Festival (The Secret Friend)
2011 Jury Award – Las Vegas International Film Festival (The Secret Friend)
2011 Grand Jury Prize – Amsterdam Film Festival (The Secret Friend)
2011 Jury Award – Cleveland International Film Festival (The Secret Friend)
2011 Special Jury Award – Canada International Film Festival (The Secret Friend)
2010 Cine Golden Eagle Award for Best Short Film – CINE (The Secret Friend)
2010 Special Jury Award – Savannah Film Festival (The Secret Friend)
2010 Best of the Fest – Palm Springs International Film Festival (The Secret Friend)
2009 Golden Palm Award – Mexico International Film Festival (Even in My Dreams)
2009 Golden Ace Award – Las Vegas Film Festival (Even in My Dreams)
2008 Audience Award – Festival Internacional de Cinema de Itu (Even in My Dreams)
2008 Technisphere Award for Best Student Film – New York University (Even in My Dreams)

References

External links 
 
 Flavio Alves official web site
 
 
 

1969 births
Living people
Brazilian gay writers
Gay screenwriters
Brazilian LGBT rights activists
Brazilian LGBT screenwriters
Brazilian film directors
LGBT film directors
People from Rio de Janeiro (city)
Brazilian emigrants to the United States
Columbia University School of General Studies alumni
English-language film directors
People with acquired American citizenship
New York University alumni